Palm Beach is a 2019 Australian comedy drama film directed by Rachel Ward and starring Sam Neill and Bryan Brown, the latter of whom also co-produces the film.

Plot
A reunion party is being held at Palm Beach in Sydney by a group of lifelong friends.

Cast
Frances Berry as Caitlin 
Bryan Brown as Frank 
Matilda Brown as Ella 
Richard E. Grant as Billy 
Aaron Jeffery as Doug 
Jacqueline McKenzie as Bridget 
Heather Mitchell as Eva 
Sam Neill as Leo 
Greta Scacchi as Charlotte 
Charlie Vickers as Dan

Response

Box office
Palm Beach grossed $3.2 million internationally, $3 million of this in Australia.

Critical reception

Sandra Hall of The Sydney Morning Herald wrote, "Rachel Ward's Palm Beach is a seniors' edition of The Big Chill, transplanted to Sydney's northern beaches and populated with a cast of Australian favourites [...] A less likeable group of actors could easily have been upstaged by the conspicuous perfection of the setting and the décor. This bunch hold their own, but a sharper script would have made them shine even brighter." Louise Keller of Urban Cinefile called the film "a good-hearted get-together of old friends and family when resentments flair, flailing relationships are revealed and secrets demand to be heard. But it aches for some grit."</ref>

Soundtrack

The original soundtrack was released on 19 July 2019, by Universal Music Australia and peaked at number 37 on the ARIA Charts.

References

External links
 
 

2019 films
Australian comedy-drama films
2019 comedy-drama films
2010s English-language films
Films set on beaches
Screen Australia films